Neyraudia is a genus of Asian and African plants in the grass family.

 Species
 Neyraudia arundinacea (L.) Henrard - Zaire, Tanzania, Malawi, Madagascar, India, Nepal, Pakistan, Tajikistan, Indochina, Hainan, Java, Malaysia, Sumatra, Lesser Sunda Islands
 Neyraudia curvipes Ohwi - Sabah, Bhutan
 Neyraudia montana Keng - Anhui, Fujian, Hubei, Jiangxi, Zhejiang
 Neyraudia reynaudiana (Kunth) Keng ex Hitchc. - Anhui, Fujian, Gansu, Guangdong, Guangxi, Guizhou, Hainan, Hubei, Hunan, Jiangsu, Jiangxi, Sichuan, Taiwan, Tibet, Yunnan, Zhejiang, Bhutan, Cambodia, Assam, Java, Sulawesi, Lesser Sunda Islands, Japan, Laos, Malaysia, Myanmar, Nepal, Thailand, Vietnam; naturalized in Florida, Veracruz, Bahamas

 formerly included
see Thysanolaena 
 Neyraudia acarifera - Thysanolaena latifolia

References

Chloridoideae
Poaceae genera